Chris Owens (1932–2022) was a performer, club owner and entrepreneur who based her act out of the French Quarter of New Orleans, Louisiana, in the United States. She was a French Quarter fixture and celebrity from the start of the 1960s through the early 21st century. Owens was well known in Louisiana and throughout the South. Tourists visiting Bourbon Street could not miss huge posters of her wearing costumes as they walked by her nightclub. Owens was known as "Queen of the Vieux Carré".

Life and work

Chris Owens was born Christine Joetta Shaw on October 5, 1932, in rural Texas, the daughter of Fred Moore Shaw Sr. and Thelma Leona Martin who married in 1925 in Haskell, Texas. Owens grew up on a farm and went to Texas Wesleyan College to be a nurse. She married car dealer Sol R. Owens in 1956 and opened a nightclub on St. Louis Street in the French Quarter; it was originally intended to be a low-key sideline establishment, but business exploded. Realizing that Owens' performance numbers were a huge draw, they sold their home in 1977 and purchased the building on the corner of St. Louis and Bourbon. Soon the "Chris Owens Review" became a noted act in town. In 1979, Sol had a heart attack and died; Owens took over management of the club and of the 30 apartments and four shops located within the building. As of 2016 the club and Owens' act continue to be a draw.

Owens hosted a yearly Easter Parade that continues to roll throughout the French Quarter.

Owens can be seen in the 1962 film The Wacky World of Doctor Morgus (see Morgus the Magnificent). She began production in 2003 of her first feature film, Let's Ballroom, in which she stars as a wealthy widow who falls in love with her dance instructor.

Death
Chris Owens died of a heart attack on the morning of Tuesday, April 5, 2022 in her St. Louis Street apartment, according to her longtime manager Kitsy Adams.

Honors
On April 22, 2006, Chris was inducted into the New Orleans Musical Legends Park with a statue created in her likeness. Her image stands next to other musical greats including Fats Domino, Pete Fountain, Allen Toussaint, Irma Thomas, Al Hirt, Ronnie Kole, and Louis Prima.

References

External links
 Chris Owens Nightclub
 
 Interview with Chris Owens, Jan. 13, 2006

Living people
Artists from New Orleans
American neo-burlesque performers
1932 births